Garanhuns is a city in the Brazilian state of Pernambuco. Located in the Borborema Plateau, the town is known as the "Suíça Pernambucana" (Pernambucan Switzerland) due to its elevation and relatively cool climate. It is also known as "Cidade das Flores" ("City of Flowers") or "Cidade da Garoa" ("City of Drizzle").

Garanhuns is most famous for the Festival de Inverno, or The Winter Festival, which it holds every year in July. This is quite cold for a city that is only a few degrees south of the equator.

Garañun (Garanhun) was an extinct, undocumented language once spoken by an indigenous tribe in the Serra dos Garanhuns.

Geography
 Region - Agreste of Pernambuco
 Boundaries - Capoeiras and Jucati  (N); Lagoa do Ouro and Correntes (S); São João and Palmeirina  (E); Caetés, Saloa, Paranatama, Brejão and  Terezinha (W)
 Area - 472.5 km2
 Elevation - 842 m
 Hydrography - Mundaú River
 Vegetation - Evergreen forest
 Climate - Mesothermal
 Annual average temperature - 20.4 °C
 Main road - BR 101, PE 126 and PE 177
 Distance to Recife - 223 km

Climate
The climate of Garanhuns is classified as tropical wet and dry, Köppen climate classification type As, with a dry summer and humid winter. Temperatures are mild for a tropical climate due to the altitude. Annual sunshine averages 2330 hours.

Tourism
It's the weather, cold for the locals and mild for foreigners, and the mountains which attract many tourists to the region during Summer and Winter. Garanhuns, Gravatá and Triunfo are the most visited mountainous (cold) cities of the state. The city is served by Garanhuns Airport.

Tourist attractions

 Winter musical festival (July)
 Flowers clock Relógio das flores
 Celso Galvao Palace
 Park Euclides Dourado and Park Ruben Van Der Linden
 João Capão Castle
 São Bento Monastery
 Ipiranga Monument
 The seven Hills.

Economy

The main economic activities in Garanhuns are based in mountain tourism (winter tourism), general commerce and primary sector especially flowers, tomatoes, manioc, cows, chickens and milk.

Economic indicators

Economy by Sector
2006

Health indicators

Notable people
Garanhuns is notable for being the hometown of President Luiz Inácio Lula da Silva, born in Caetés, which was a district of Garanhuns until 1963. The film Lula, o filho do Brasil, about his life, was shot in the town.

The composer and musician Dominguinhos was also born in the city, as well as the actress Lívia Falcão, well known for her work in both TV and stage.

See also
 Garanhuns Winter Festival video

References

Municipalities in Pernambuco
Winter festivals